This is a list of Turkish football transfers in the summer transfer window 2013 by club. Only transfers of the Süper Lig are included.

Süper Lig

Galatasaray
Note: Flags indicate national team as has been defined under FIFA eligibility rules. Players may hold more than one non-FIFA nationality.

In:

Out:

Fenerbahçe

In:

Out:

Beşiktaş

In:

Out:

Bursaspor

In:

Out:

Kayserispor

In:

Out:

Kasımpaşa

In:

Out:

Antalyaspor

In:

Out:

Eskişehirspor

In:

Out:

Trabzonspor

In:

Out:

Gaziantepspor

In:

Out:

Gençlerbirliği

In:

Out:

Sivasspor

In:

Out:

Elazığspor

In:

Out:

Akhisar Belediyespor

In:

Out:

Karabükspor

In:

Out:

Kayseri Erciyesspor

In:

Out:

Çaykur Rizespor

In:

Out:

Konyaspor

In:

Out:

See also
 2013–14 Süper Lig
 2013–14 TFF First League

References

Transfers
Turkey
2013